Qaleh-ye Tileh Kuh (also Romanized as Qal‘eh-ye Tīleh Kūh) is a village in Dodangeh Rural District, in the Central District of Behbahan County, Khuzestan Province, Iran.

Population 
At the 2006 census, its population was 74, in 13 families.

References 

Populated places in Behbahan County